Thyreus caeruleopunctatus, commonly known as the chequered cuckoo bee, is a parasitic bee of the genus Thyreus, also called cuckoo bees. It is a stocky bee, notable for its brilliant metallic blue and black banded colors.

References

Apinae
Hymenoptera of Australia
Insects described in 1840